Hair grass is a common name for several plants and can refer to:

 Agrostis hyemalis (winter bentgrass, ticklegrass)
 Agrostis scabra, "hair grass" (rough bent grass, winter bent grass, ticklegrass)
 Aira, hairgrass
 Aira caryophyllea, silver hairgrass
 Aira praecox, early hair grass
 Corynephorus canescens, grey hair-grass
 Deschampsia, hair grass
 Eleocharis acicularis, dwarf hairgrass
 Eleocharis parvula, "hairgrass" (dwarf spikerush, small spikerush)
 Koeleria glauca, Blue Hair Grass
 Koeleria macrantha, crested hair grass
 Koeleria vallesiana, Somerset hair grass
 Rostraria cristata, Mediterranean hair grass